Pakistan khappay is a Sindhi language phrase which means "We want Pakistan".

Origin and usage 
The term was first used and coined by the  President Asif Ali Zardari. Since then phrase has become important part of Zardari's speech.

Criticism 
Critics of Asif Ali Zardari and PPP question if he meant a Punjabi meaning or a Sindhi meaning when he said ‘Pakistan Khappay’.
People’s confusion regarding this word “khappay” has increased since Zardari has delivered speeches, first in Faisalabad on 17 January 2010 and then in Talagang (Danda Shah Bilawal) on 21 January 2010, when he gave speeches in Punjabi on both occasions and he used this phrase.

Other media
Munir Ahmad Memon wrote a book with name Pakistan Khappay and presented it to Nisar Ahmad Khuhro

References

Sindhi words and phrases
Pakistani nationalism
Political terminology in Pakistan
Asif Ali Zardari
Pakistani political slogans
Pakistan People's Party